Ortigosa may refer to:

People
  (born 1982), Spanish handball player
 Oscar Ortigosa (born 1966), Peruvian swimmer

Places
 
 Ortigosa de Cameros, La Rioja, Spain
 Ortigosa de Pestaño, Segovia, Spain
 Ortigosa del Monte, Segovia, Spain

See also
 Ortigoza